Sophia Mallonée Gholz (born October 17, 1980) is an American writer of children's books, both fiction and non-fiction.

Biography and career
Gholz was born in Gainesville, Florida. She was the second child of Nancy Dohn, an American corporate manager, and Henry Gholz, an American scientist.

Gholz's first book, The Boy Who Grew A Forest: The True Story of Jadav Payeng (published by Sleeping Bear Press in 2019 and illustrated by Kayla Harren) is an award-winning picture book that has been translated into multiple languages.

Gholz's books include Jack Horner, Dinosaur Hunter!, a picture book biography about the paleontologist who inspired the main character in Jurassic Park, This is Your World: The Story of Bob Ross, and A History of Toilet Paper (and Other Potty Tools).  The bibliography below lists her published works.

Gholz's media appearances and interviews include BBC UK, The Sun News, Nonahood News, North East News India, Discovery Channel, Orlando Voyager, The Buzz TV The Bookshop at the End of the Internet Podcast, and The New York Times.

Select awards 
 Florida State Book Award Gold Medal for The Boy Who Grew A Forest (2020)
 South Carolina Children's Book Award Nominee (2020–21)
 Green Earth Book Award Honor (2020)
 Crystal Kite Award Winner, Southeast Region (2020)
 Keystone to Reading Book Award Shortlist (2020–21)
 Children's Book Council Notable Social Studies Trade Books for Young People (2020)
 Sigurd F. Olson Nature Writing Award Winner from Northland College (2019)
 Eureka! Nonfiction Children's Book Honor Award, California Reading Association (2019)

Published Works 
 The Boy Who Grew a Forest: The True Story of Jadav Payeng (2019), illustrated by Kayla Harren
 Jack Horner, Dinosaur Hunter! (2021), illustrated by Dave Shephard
 This is Your World: The Story of Bob Ross (2021), illustrated by Robin Boyden
 A History of Toilet Paper (and Other Potty Tools) (2022), illustrated by Xiana Teimoy
 Bug on the Rug (2022), illustrated by Susan Batori

Personal life 
In 2008, Gholz married Jeff Olson, an American photographer and businessman. They had two children and live in Florida.

Adaptations 
In 2022, stage rights were acquired to adapt the German translation, Der Junge, Einen Eald Pflanzte (Zuckersüß Verlag), of Gholz's book The Boy Who Grew A Forest: The True Story of Jadav Payeng, for a stage production at the Staatstheater Meiningen Theater in Berlin and the Humboldt Forum in Berlin.

External links 
 
 NBC News 
 Sophia Gholz at Library of Congress

References 

1980 births
Living people
American children's writers
American women children's writers
20th-century American writers